Lac Lancre is a lake in the Canadian province of Quebec. This lake is located in 
Réservoir-Dozois (unorganized area), La Vallée-de-l'Or (regional county municipality, Abitibi-Témiscamingue (administrative region), Quebec, Canada.

References

Lakes of Abitibi-Témiscamingue